The Rakes were an indie rock band based in London, England. At the time of the band splitting in October 2009, the band line-up consisted of Alan Donohoe (lead vocals and rhythm guitar), Matthew Swinnerton (lead guitar), Jamie Hornsmith (bass) and Lasse Petersen (drums). The Rakes' discography consisted of three studio albums, one EP and nine singles.

The Rakes released their debut studio album, Capture/Release, in the UK in August 2005 on V2 Records. The record was generally well received by critics, and achieved a peak position of #32 on the UK Albums Chart. A total of six singles were released from the album, with the most successful being the bonus track on the reissue of the album, "All Too Human", which peaked at #22 in the UK Singles Chart in March 2006. In October 2005, the band released an EP in the United States, which featured six different tracks including three songs from the album, two previously unreleased tracks and a remix of the song "Retreat".

On 19 March 2007, The Rakes released their second album, Ten New Messages, which achieved a peak position of #38 in the UK Albums Chart, and was preceded by the first single from the record, "The World Was a Mess But His Hair Was Perfect". The album was the band's most successful in France, achieving a peak position of #77 in the SNEP chart. The group released their third and most recent studio album, Klang on 23 March 2009. The record was their least successful commercially, failing to chart in the UK, and peaking at #91 in France. Before the band split, only one single was released from the album; "1989" was released one week before the album but failed to chart in the UK.

Studio albums

Extended plays

Singles

Compilation and soundtrack appearances
The Rakes have had a number of songs featured on compilation albums. The songs "Strasbourg", "22 Grand Job" and "Binary Love" have all appeared on New Musical Express albums. "22 Grand Job" and "Retreat" have featured on V2 compilations. The track "The World Was a Mess But His Hair Was Perfect" appeared on the 2007 CD, The State of Independence. The video game FIFA 06 featured a censored version of the song "Strasbourg". "1989" is in Dirt 2.

References

Discographies of British artists
Rock music group discographies